The Gabardan Solar Park is a 67.5 megawatt (MW) photovoltaic power station in France. It has about 872,300 thin-film PV panels made by First Solar, and incorporates a 2 MW pilot plant using 11,100 solar trackers.

See also 

Photovoltaic power stations
List of largest power stations in the world
List of photovoltaic power stations

References 

Photovoltaic power stations in France